PROPAGANDA is a large collection of GPL-licensed seamless desktop backgrounds included in various Linux distributions, and available via free download over the web. While no longer being produced or even officially hosted online, the collection consisted of approximately 15 volumes of largely abstract and surreal art, numbering over 1,000 images in total. Created in GIMP by Bowie J. Poag, the images were meant to attract users to the platform by virtue of the art having been 100% Linux-generated.

The style of the images produced by Poag were unusual in terms of their geometric qualities. Appearing to repeat seamlessly along all four edges, PROPAGANDA images became attractive for use in 3D modeling, and particularly for use as desktop wallpaper, in that limitations in graphics hardware at the time often prevented users from using full screen 24-bit images. Using smaller, tileable images for desktop backgrounds helped keep memory utilization to a minimum, while still allowing early Linux desktops to be visually appealing.

After ten months, Poag turned control of the project over to Naru Sundar who was then a student at the California Institute of Technology. Although Sundar would subsequently release two additional volumes, Poag terminated the project in April 2000 citing a lack of activity by Sundar, and a falling out with Chris DiBona, a manager of community projects at VA Linux Systems, who provided hosting space for his project.

As a side source of amusement, PROPAGANDA's website featured a satirical storyline that John F. Kennedy had faked his own assassination in 1963, and had placed himself into cryogenic suspension until the time was right to lead the charge against Microsoft, and help the Linux movement gain footing. While not greatly influential, Poag's work with PROPAGANDA led many to develop an interest in Linux as a platform during its formative early years.

The Propaganda site was formerly officially hosted at http://propaganda.system12.com/ and then http://propaganda.themes.org before going offline.

References

External links 
 Comment posted by Bowie J. Poag to Slashdot article on "New Propaganda Series: Rebirth", retrieved 2007-12-30
 Complete Image Archive
 GitHub Repository with all Propaganda Volumes Available for Browsing or cloning
Art websites